Jacky is a 2015 English/Japanese drama film directed by Fow Pyng Hu and Brat Ljatifi. It was screened in the Un Certain Regard section at the 2000 Cannes Film Festival.

Cast
 Fow Pyng Hu - Jacky
 Eveline Wu - Chi Chi
 Gary Guo - Gary
 Xuan Wei Zhou - Mother
 Jiah Bao Toh - Pau Pau
 Ka Way Chui - Tourist girl
 Chee Ngai Ng - Tourist boy
 Ad van Kempen - Real estate agent

References

External links

2000 films
2000 drama films
Dutch drama films
2000s Dutch-language films